General elections were held in Kuwait on 20 October 1992. A total of 275 candidates contested the election, which saw independents win the largest number of seats, and candidates opposed to the government win a total of 31 seats. Voter turnout was 83.2%.

Background
As a result of increasing conflict between the Kuwaiti ruling family and the elected parliament, the Kuwaiti parliament had been disbanded in 1986, so when Saddam Hussein's Iraqi troops annexed the country, there was no parliament. The USA, supported by the international community, made its support to the Kuwaiti ruling family conditional on the restoration of democracy, which was agreed to by Kuwait in the Jeddah conference of October 1990.

Electoral system
Kuwaitis who could not trace their ancestry to 1920, as well as women, were not eligible to vote. This resulted in limiting qualified voters to a mere 14% of the country’s nationals, or 81,440 voters.

Results

References

Kuwait
Election
Elections in Kuwait
Non-partisan elections